Victor Alexandrovch Sokovnin (1886–1937) was an opera singer and vocal teacher.
Born in the village Zavodouspenskoe, Tyumen county Tobolsk Province (now Tugulymsky district, Sverdlovsk Oblast). In 1906 he graduated from Business School, Society for Mutual helper clerk in Yekaterinburg. In 1911-1918 he studied at the solo singing class of Professor I. Ya. Gordy Moscow State Conservatory.

In Krasnoyarsk
In 1920, after the Civil War took part in the theatrical life of the city of Krasnoyarsk. He taught at the vocal department of the People's Conservatory, created by P.I. Slovtsov(Sokovnin was the personal friend and the scenic partner of this outstanding tenor
).
Actively participated in the performances delivered by this remarkable Russian tenor in the opera Labour team and was his stage partner in the operas "La Traviata", "Mermaid" and other operas, which have documented are not installed. Participated in the Krasnoyarsk Philharmonic Society "Music to the masses" 1928–1931 years., Until its closure Glavrepetkomom. For some time led the music school in the city of Tyumen.

In Omsk
In July 1935, V.A. Sokovnin headed Omsk music college. (From December 1934 to January 1938 Omsk Music School led by six Directors: N.V. Komov, D.I. Dianov, V.A. Sokovnin, G.N. Grishkevich, V.M. Mozhayeva, Motovinsky). Now, the Omsk regional music school named after one of its first graduating class - Soviet composer V.Y. Shabalin. To search for talented youth in the Omsk region went to a special expedition of teachers from the Muses. College. In Sverdlovsk, Viktor acquired an excellent Sheets Library, where he found the score of the opera "Boris Godunov" by Modest Mussorgsky, personal proofreader amended Rimsky-Korsakov, not entered into the later editions of the opera. Created a branch school-based educational institutions in Omsk, a military school and the management of the railroad, which allowed them to purchase musical college status of the regional music school. Sokovnin organized in Omsk, the first symphony orchestra from college students, musicians and fans of local theater. Organizing the reconstruction of the old stables at a hostel for students and teachers, in connection with the acute housing shortage. He organized concerts in Omsk Brass (leader-V. J. Verzhahovsky, later Professor of the Novosibirsk Conservatory) and symphony orchestras in the clubs of Omsk. He was the initiator of the tour in Omsk outstanding musicians - violinists B.O. Sibor,  еhe professor on a violin class of the Moscow Conservatory P. Ilchenko and piano professor Alexander Borisovich Goldenweiser and V.N. Shatsky (director of the Moscow Conservatory).

Sentencing and rehabilitation
In 1936, withdrawn from work. Arrested on 14 September 1937, accused of anti-Soviet activities under Article 58 of the Criminal Code of the RSFSR, October 10, sentenced to death, who was executed November 24, 1937 One of the accusations made by Sergeant NKVD P.G. Popandopulo , was the purchase of music, "in of which include the patriotic musical numbers of the autocratic Russian government, up to "God Save the Tsar". (Month before father-in-law Sokovnin - Petrov Ivan Mihajlovich working as the director of the factory on manufacture of cross ties in the city of Omsk has been shot).
In 1960 Sokovnin V.A. exonerated for lack of evidence.

Sources
  Sergey Rychkov.  "Leeches, "God Save the Tsar!" and Pavlik Morozov". «Yamalskiy meridian», the magazine of history and literature, № 7, 2009, p. 39.

1886 births
1937 deaths
Operatic basses
Male opera singers from the Russian Empire
Male opera signers from the Soviet Union
Vocal coaches